The Battle of Cabala was fought in Sicily between Carthage and Syracuse.  Syracuse was victorious.

It is uncertain in what year it was fought and could have occurred in any year from 378 BCE to 375 BCE.  The exact location of Cabala is also unknown.

Dionysius I commanded the Syracusian forces while Mago commanded the Carthaginians.  Diodorus states that Mago was killed and the Carthaginians lost 10,000 dead and a further 5000 were taken prisoners.

Notes 

Cabala Battle of
370s BC
370s BC conflicts